Carrie is a 1974 horror novel by American author Stephen King. Set in Chamberlain, Maine, the plot revolves around Carrie White, a friendless, bullied high-school girl from an abusive religious household who discovers she has telekinetic powers. Feeling guilty for harassing Carrie, Sue Snell invites Carrie to the prom with Tommy Ross, but a humiliating prank during the prom by Chris Hargensen leads to Carrie destroying the town with her powers. The narrative contains fictional documents in approximately chronological order that present multiple perspectives on the prom incident and its perpetrator. Carrie deals with themes of ostracism and revenge, with the opening shower scene and the destruction of Chamberlain being pivotal scenes.

King started writing Carrie, intended to be a short story for the men's magazine Cavalier, after a friend's suggestion to write a story of a female character. Though King initially gave up on Carrie due to discomfort and apathy, and felt it would never be successful, his wife Tabitha convinced him to continue writing. King based the character of Carrie on two girls he knew in high school and enjoyed fabricating the documents for the narrative. After Doubleday accepted Carrie to be published, King worked with editor Bill Thompson to revise the novel.

Carrie was published on April 5, 1974, with a print run of 30,000 copies, and a paperback edition was published by New American Library in April 1975. The paperback edition became a bestseller, particularly after the release of the 1976 film adaptation, reaching four million sales. Carrie received generally positive reviews, both contemporaneously and retrospectively. Being a debut novel, Carrie launched King's career and helped achieve him mainstream success. It has also been credited for reviving mainstream interest in horror fiction and being influential among contemporary horror writers. Four film adaptations have been released, with one getting a sequel, and a musical adaptation was released in 1988.

Plot
In 1979 Chamberlain, Maine, Carietta "Carrie" White is a 16-year-old girl ridiculed for her frumpy appearance and unusual religious beliefs, instilled by her despotic mother, Margaret. One day, Carrie has her first period while showering in the girls' locker room after physical education class. Carrie is terrified, having no understanding of menstruation as her mother, who finds sexuality sinful, never taught her. While Carrie panics, her classmates, led by a wealthy, popular girl named Chris Hargensen, mock and throw tampons and sanitary napkins at her. The gym teacher, Rita Desjardin, has Carrie compose herself and sends her home. On the way, Carrie practices her unusual ability to control objects from a distance. She recalls using this power was when she was three to cause stones to fall from the sky. Once Carrie gets home, Margaret furiously accuses Carrie of sin and locks her in a closet.

The next day, Desjardin reprimands the girls who bullied Carrie and gives them a week's detention; Chris refuses to comply and is punished with suspension and exclusion from the prom. After her influential father fails to reinstate her, Chris decides to take revenge on Carrie. Sue Snell, another popular girl who bullied Carrie in the locker room, grows remorseful, and asks her boyfriend, Tommy Ross, to invite Carrie to the prom instead. Carrie is suspicious, but accepts and begins sewing a prom dress. Meanwhile, Chris persuades her boyfriend Billy Nolan and his gang of greasers to gather two buckets of pig blood as she prepares to rig the prom queen election in Carrie's favor.

The prom initially goes well for Carrie: Tommy's friends are welcoming, and Tommy finds he is attracted to Carrie as a friend. Chris successfully rigs the election, and Carrie and Tommy are elected prom queen and king. However, at the moment of the coronation, Chris, from outside, dumps the pig blood onto Carrie's and Tommy's heads. Tommy is knocked unconscious by one of the buckets and dies. The sight of Carrie drenched in blood invokes laughter from the audience. Carrie leaves the building, humiliated.

Outside, Carrie remembers her telekinesis and decides to enact vengeance on her tormentors. Using her powers, she seals the gym, activates the sprinkler system, inadvertently electrocuting many of her classmates, and causes a fire that eventually ignites the school's fuel tanks, destroying the building in a massive explosion; only a few lucky staff and students escape. Carrie, overwhelmed by rage, thwarts any incoming effort to fight the fire by opening the hydrants within the school's vicinity, then destroys gas stations and cuts power lines on her way home. She unleashes her telekinetic powers on the town, destroying several buildings and killing hundreds of people. As she does this, she broadcasts a telepathic message, showing the townspeople that the carnage was caused by her.

Carrie returns home to confront Margaret, who believes Carrie has been possessed by Satan and must be killed. Margaret tells her that her conception was a result of what may have been marital rape. She stabs Carrie in the shoulder with a kitchen knife, and Carrie halts Margaret's heart as she says a prayer. Mortally wounded, Carrie makes her way to the roadhouse where she was conceived. She sees Chris and Billy leaving, having been informed of the destruction by one of Billy's friends. After Billy attempts to run Carrie over, she takes control of his car and sends it into a wall, killing Billy and Chris.

Sue, who has been following Carrie's "broadcast", finds her collapsed in the parking lot, bleeding from the knife wound. The two have a brief telepathic conversation. Carrie had believed that Sue and Tommy had set up the prank, but realizes they were innocent. Carrie forgives her bullying and dies, crying out for her mother.

A state of emergency is declared and the survivors make plans to relocate. Chamberlain foresees desolation in spite of the government assisting on rehabilitating the worker districts. Desjardin and the school's principal blame themselves for the disaster and resign from teaching. Sue publishes a memoir based on her experiences. A "White Committee" report investigating paranormal abilities concludes that there will be others like Carrie. An Appalachian woman enthusiastically writes to her sister about her baby daughter's telekinetic powers and reminisces about their grandmother, who had similar abilities.

Style and themes
Carrie is a horror novel and an example of supernatural and gothic fiction. It is an epistolary novel: the narrative is organized through a collection of reports and excerpts in approximate chronological order, and is structured around a framing device consisting of multiple narrators. Leigh A. Ehlers, a literary scholar, has argued that this structure is used to indicate that no particular viewpoint, scientific or otherwise, can explain Carrie and the prom night event.

Carrie deals with themes of ostracism, centering around Carrie being ostracized for not conforming to societal norms. A driving force of the novel is her first period in the shower leading to her being pelted with tampons and further scorned. Sue is one of the few people to feel genuine remorse for Carrie and arranges a date with Sue's boyfriend, Tommy, for the Spring Ball. However, Chris's need for vengeance against Carrie results in pig blood being dumped on Carrie during the Spring Ball. This results in Carrie committing a massacre among the school and Chamberlain. Following the massacre, Sue is subject to the same exclusion as Carrie, despite her altruistic motives. John Kerrigan, a literary scholar, and Victoria Madden have observed that throughout the novel, Carrie is often associated with pigs, which are considered "disgusting" animals.

Carrie also deals with themes of vengeance. Throughout the novel, Carrie is forced through various hardships that she manages to endure for years without using her supernatural powers. However, after being invited to a prom only to have pig blood dumped on her, Carrie "breaks" and annihilates the city. Kerrigan considers Carrie to be an example of a revenge tragedy. Ray B. Browne argues that the novel serves as a "revenge fantasy", while novelist Charles L. Grant has stated that "[Stephen] King uses the evil/victim device for terror". Some scholars have argued that Carrie is a social commentary. Linda J. Holland-Toll has stated that "Carrie is about disaffirmation because society makes the human monster, cannot control the monster, yet still denies the possibility of actual monster existence while simultaneously defining humans as monsters".

Background and writing

By the time of writing Carrie, King lived in a trailer in Hermon, Maine with his wife Tabitha and two children. He had a job teaching English at Hampden Academy, and wrote short stories for men's magazines such as Cavalier. Carrie was originally a short story intended for Cavalier, and King started conceptualizing the story after a friend suggested writing a story about a female character.

The basis of the story was King imagining a scene of a girl menstruating for the first time in the shower similar to the opening scene of Carrie and an article from Life about telekinesis. As he wrote the opening shower scene, King experienced discomfort due to not being female and not knowing how he would react to the scene if he were female. He also felt apathy toward Carrie when writing the scene. After three pages, King eventually threw away the manuscript of the story. The next day, Tabitha retrieved the pages from the trash and convinced King to continue writing the story with input from her. King was ultimately able to emotionally connect to Carrie through the influence of two girls he knew. One was constantly abused at school due to her family's poverty forcing her to wear only one outfit to school. The other was a timid girl from a devoutly religious family.

King believed Carrie would not be successful, thinking it would not be marketable in any genre or to any audience. He also found writing it to be a "waste of time" and found no point in sending out what he perceived as a failed story. King only continued writing it in order to please his wife and because he was unable to think of anything else to write. When King finished the first draft, Carrie was a 98-page long novella that he detested. In December 1972, King decided to rewrite Carrie and strive for it to become novel-length. He wrote in fabricated documents that were purported to be from periodicals such as Esquire and Reader's Digest, imitating their style accordingly; a process that King found entertaining. After Carrie was accepted by the publisher Doubleday, King revised the novel with editor and friend Bill Thompson. The original ending of Carrie had Carrie growing demon horns and destroying an airplane thousands of miles above her. Thompson convinced King to rewrite the ending to be more subtle.

Publication

King's manuscript for Carrie was given to Thompson in November 1973. Seeing potential in the novel in light of recent horror novels such as Rosemary's Baby (1967), Thompson convinced Lee Barker, executive editor of Doubleday, to accept the novel. In 1973, after much revision, advanced copies of Carrie were sent to salesmen to secure an advance. Eventually, the novel was approved for an advance of $1500. Thompson convinced Doubleday to boost the advance to $2500, moderately high for a debut novel at the time, and it was announced to King via telegram. With a print run of 30,000 copies, the hardback edition of Carrie was ultimately published on April 5, 1974. Although Carrie was marketed as an "occult" novel, trade reviewers at the time of release called it a horror novel.

On May 3, 1974, Carrie was received by the publishing company New English Library and was read overnight by president Bob Tanner. Tanner sent a copy to the parent company, New American Library, which then offered Doubleday $400,000 for rights to mass-market paperback publication of Carrie, of which King received $200,000. New English Library published Carrie in May 1974, and New American Library published Carrie under its Signet Books imprint in April 1975. With the goal of persuading the reader to buy the book, New American Library designed the novel to be "double-covered". The original cover of the paperback edition did not feature the title or the author's name; it consisted of the face of a girl in front of a silhouette. Behind the cover was a two-page picture of New England on fire, with the title and author's name on the far right. New American Library planned for the girl's silhouette to be scored to allow the reader to see the burning New England picture. The printers refused to produce the technique, and the edition was published without the scoring. Since initial publication, Carrie has remained in continual print and has been published throughout Europe.

Reception
The hardback edition of Carrie sold modestly, but not spectacularly; it was not a bestseller. Sources of the number of sales for the hardback edition vary, ranging from 13,000 copies to 17,000 copies. In contrast, the paperback edition sold exceedingly well. In its first year, the edition sold one million copies. The sales were bolstered by the 1976 film adaptation, totaling four million sales. Carrie became a New York Times bestseller, debuting on the list in December 1976 and remaining on it for 14 weeks, peaking at number 3.

Carrie received generally positive reviews and has become a fan favorite. Various critics considered it an impressive literary debut. Newgate Callendar of The New York Times stated that despite being a debut novel, "King writes with the kind of surety normally associated only with veteran writers". The Daily Times-Advocate Ina Bonds considers the novel an "admirable achievement" for a first novel, and Kirkus Reviews believes that the debut novel is handled well by King with little nonsense. Bob Cormier from the Daily Sentinel & Leominster Enterprise believes that the novel could've failed because of the subject matter, but didn't, and thus finds King to be "no ordinary writer".

Various critics wrote that the plot will scare readers, with Library Journal declaring the novel "a terrifying treat for both horror and parapsychology fans". Mary Schedl of The San Francisco Examiner wrote that Carrie "goes far beyond the usual limitations of the [horror] genre" to deliver a message about humanity. Publishers Weekly praised the novel for its sympathetic portrayal of Carrie. Both Joy Antos of Progress Bulletin and Gary Bogart of Wilson Library Journal wrote of enjoying Carrie despite the foregone conclusion. Nonetheless, Booklist stated that reading the novel required a "willing suspension of belief and taste".

Retrospectively, Carrie has received appraisal. Michael R. Collings and Adam Nevill declared that the plot holds up decades after publication. Collings attributed it to focus and conciseness, and Nevill attributed it to the characterization and structure. In his literary analysis, Rocky Wood called the plot "remarkably short but compelling". Michael Berry of Common Sense Media lauded the characterization and said that the epistolary structure "lend[s] a sense of realism to the outlandish proceedings". While both Grady Hendrix and James Smythe similarly praised the story; Hendrix felt that the writing was awkward much of the time, and Smythe found the epistolary-style extracts to be the "worst [and slowest] parts of the novel". Although Harold Bloom found the characterization and style to be unremarkable, he thought the novel had strong imagery and said that "Carrie at the prom scene... is a marvelous culmination of melodrama."

Legacy

Carrie launched King's career as an author; the $200,000 King received when Carrie was accepted for mass-market publication allowed King to quit his job as a teacher and become a full-time author. The novel established King as a horror writer that wrote about "the supernatural, the dark, and the bizarre". Following Carrie publication, King underwent a six-month period of prolific writing. During this period, King wrote rough drafts for Blaze and 'Salem's Lot, the latter of which became his second published novel, being published in 1976. Both Carrie and its 1976 film adaptation brought King into the mainstream, and he has since become one of the most successful authors in the modern era, with his novels consistently becoming bestsellers.

For decades prior to the 1970s, horror literature had not been in the mainstream; the last novel to reach the Publishers Weekly bestseller list was Rebecca (1938). Carrie is credited as one of four novels to result in contemporary mainstream interest in horror literature. This interest was especially bolstered by their respective adaptations, allowing these novels to become bestsellers. Carrie has been influential among contemporary horror writers, with writers such as Smyth and Sarah Lotz claiming to be influenced by Carrie. Author Jeff VanderMeer said of Carrie influence:

Carrie has received three film adaptations and a musical adaptation. The first, directed by Brian De Palma and starring Sissy Spacek in the title role, was released on November 3, 1976, to critical acclaim and commercial success, and is considered a noteworthy example of 1970s horror films and a major factor to King's success. A sequel to the 1976 film adaptation titled The Rage: Carrie 2 was released in 1999 to mixed reviews. From May 12–15, 1988, a musical adaptation was performed five times by the Royal Shakespeare Company at the Virginia Theater before closing. It was a commercial and critical failure, losing more than $7 million, among the most expensive failures by Broadway theatre. A 2002 film adaptation received negative reviews, and a 2013 film adaptation received mixed reviews. An off-Broadway revival of the musical was performed from March 1–April 8, 2012. The television series Riverdale aired an episode titled "Chapter Thirty-One: A Night to Remember" in 2018 based on the musical.

See also
 The Fury, a 1976 novel with a similar premise and its 1978 film adaptation, also directed by De Palma
 Jennifer, a 1978 film with a similar premise

Notes

References

Sources

Further reading
 Shih, Paris Shun-Hsiang. "Fearing the Witch, Hating the Bitch: The Double Structure of Misogyny in Stephen King's Carrie" in Perceiving Evil: Evil Women and the Feminine (Brill, 2015) pp. 49–58.

External links

Official website for Carrie the Musical
Identification characteristics for first edition copies of Carrie
 Carrie at the Internet Speculative Fiction Database

1974 American novels
1974 fantasy novels
American horror novels
American novels adapted into films
Carrie (franchise)
Censored books
Debut fantasy novels
Epistolary novels
Novels by Stephen King
Novels set in the 1970s
Novels set in Maine
Fiction set in 1979
American novels adapted into television shows
Doubleday (publisher) books
Novels about mass murder
Matricide in fiction
Novels about bullying
Works based on Cinderella
Proms in fiction
Novels about telekinesis
Novels about child abuse
Christianity in fiction
1974 debut novels
Obscenity controversies in literature
Religious controversies in literature
Novels based on fairy tales